Turkey is a founding member of the United Nations, the Organisation of the Islamic Conference (now the Organisation of Islamic Cooperation), the Organisation for Economic Co-operation and Development and the Organization for Security and Co-operation in Europe, a member state of the Council of Europe since 1949, and of NATO since 1952. Since 2005, Turkey is in accession negotiations with the European Union, having been an associate member since 1963 and is also in European Customs Union. Turkey is also a member of the G20 industrial nations which brings together the 20 largest economies of the world.

Turkey entered NATO in 1952 and serves as the organization's vital eastern anchor, controlling the straits leading from the Black Sea to the Mediterranean and sharing a border with Syria, Iraq, and Iran. A NATO headquarters is located in İzmir, and the United States has maintained air forces at a Turkish base called Incirlik that is located near the Mediterranean city of Adana.

Turkey is also member of the World Trade Organization (WTO). It has signed free trade agreements with the European Free Trade Association (EFTA), Israel, the United Kingdom and many other countries. In 1992, Turkey and 10 other regional nations formed the Black Sea Economic Cooperation Business Council to expand regional trade and economic cooperation.

In December 2000 Turkey became an observer state of the Association of Caribbean States (ACS). In 2017 ASEAN-Turkey Sectoral Dialogue Partnership was recognized by the 50th ASEAN Foreign Ministers' Meeting in Manila, Philippines.

List of international organizations

ASEAN (Sectoral Dialogue Partner)
ACD
ADB
AfDB
Amnesty International
Australia Group
BIPM
BIS
Black Sea Naval Force
BSEC
CE
CEN
CERN (associate member)
CICA
Community of Portuguese Language Countries (observer)
Developing-8
EAPC
EBRD
ECE
EFTU
EUMETSAT 
EUROCONTROL
European Forest Institute
European Political Community (2022)
European Union (candidate)
FATF
G20

G33
IAEA
IBRD
ICAO
ICC
ICRM
ICSID
IDA
International Energy Agency
IEA
IEC
IFAD
IFC
IFRCS
IHO
ILO
IMF
IMO
IMSO
IOC
IOC
IOM
IRENA
ISO
ITSO

ITU
ITUC
International Federation of Red Cross and Red Crescent Societies
Inmarsat
Interpol
Intergovernmental Organisation for International Carriage by Rail
NATO
NEA
NSG
OECD
OIC
OPCW
OSCE
Paris Club — associate member
PCA
TAKM
TRACECA
Turkic Council
TURKPA
TÜRKSOY

UfM
UIC
UN
UNCTAD
UNEP
UNESCO
UNHCR
UNIDO
UNIFIL
UNIKOM
UNITAR
UNMIBH
UNMIK
UPU
WCO
WFP
WHO
WIPO
WMO
WTrO
World Turks Qurultai
Zangger Committee

See also
Foreign relations of Turkey
Free-trade agreements of Turkey
Turkey–United States relations
Turkey–United Kingdom relations
Turkey–European Union relations
Russia–Turkey relations
Ministry of Foreign Affairs of Turkey
List of Turkish diplomats
Turkish diplomatic missions
Politics of Turkey
Republic of Turkey
Ottoman Empire

Notes

References

Further reading
 Contessi, Nicola P. "Turkey and the Shanghai Cooperation Organization: Common values, economics or pure geopolitics?" in Emre Erşen, Seçkin Köstem, eds. Turkey's Pivot to Eurasia. Geopolitics and Foreign Policy in a Changing World Order, Routledge, 2019, pp. 93–110.

International organization membership by country
Foreign relations of Turkey